Eppendorf can refer to:

Eppendorf, Saxony, a German town in the Freiberg district in Saxony
Eppendorf, Hamburg, a quarter of Hamburg
Eppendorf, Bochum, a quarter of Bochum
Eppendorf (company), a biotechnology company in Eppendorf, Hamburg
Microcentrifuge tubes, some laboratory tubes also known as Eppendorf tubes, named after the company